is a former Japanese football player.

Playing career
Koga was born in Yokohama on 12 February 1970. After graduating from Waseda University, he joined Kashima Antlers in 1992. He played mainly as offensive midfielder and forward. He moved to Japan Football League club Brummell Sendai in 1997. He played many matches and moved to Sanfrecce Hiroshima in 1998. He retired end of 2000 season.

Club statistics

References

External links

biglobe.ne.jp

1970 births
Living people
Waseda University alumni
Association football people from Kanagawa Prefecture
Japanese footballers
J1 League players
Japan Football League (1992–1998) players
Kashima Antlers players
Vegalta Sendai players
Sanfrecce Hiroshima players
Association football midfielders